Utopia, internationally titled Dreamland, is a Logie Award-winning Australian television comedy series by Working Dog Productions that premiered on the ABC on 13 August 2014.  The series follows the working lives of a team in the fictional Nation Building Authority, a newly created government organisation. The Authority is responsible for overseeing major infrastructure projects, from announcement to unveiling.  The series explores the collision between bureaucracy and grand ambitions. The second series aired in 2015, beginning with the first episode on 19 August 2015. The third series aired in 2017, beginning with the first episode on 19 July 2017. The fourth series aired in 2019, beginning on 21 August 2019.  A fifth series is in production for release in 2023.

Plot
The series is set inside the offices of the fictional Nation Building Authority, a newly created government organisation responsible for overseeing major infrastructure projects ranging from new roads and rail lines to airports and high rise urban developments. It follows the working lives of a tight-knit team of bureaucrats in charge of guiding big building schemes from announcement to unveiling. Throughout the series grand projects are frustrated by self-interest, publicity stunts, constant shifts in political priorities and bureaucracy.

The series features a number of recurring themes. The office is continually focused on various fads. In one episode, staff become obsessed with exercise after a visit from a Heart Smart representative, practising communal yoga in the office at regular intervals. In another episode, Amy (Davidson) hires an indoor plant consultant, making major changes to office air conditioning and lighting, after Tony's (Sitch) plant dies and he asks for a replacement. 

Rhonda (Flanagan) frequently attends conferences or workshops on various forms of online media. She returns to the office enthusiastically and doggedly drawing priorities away from important projects to superficial online projects on how to engage more with their relevant "audience."

Background
Utopia is written and produced by three of the founding members of Working Dog Productions: Rob Sitch, Santo Cilauro and Tom Gleisner. It is produced by Michael Hirsh, directed by Sitch who also stars as one of the main characters Tony, and casting managed by Jane Kennedy. When casting, Sitch wanted to have actors that possessed a certain acting style, that appeared as if nothing absurd was going on. Sitch described the series as being about "the currency of grand dreams". He described that the idea of the "National Building Authority" was to portray it as one of those things that got set up in a bit of a mad rush and that under all the grand dreams there was a white elephant waiting to appear. Utopia continues on the satirical themes of other Working Dog works such as Frontline and The Hollowmen. Sitch also noted that the series was more observational than satirical and that it depicted how organisations may or may not function. When creating the show, Gleisner said the production team spoke to people who worked with government authorities and had experienced for themselves the daily unpredictabilities of working in these environments.

Characters 
Main cast
 Tony Woodford (Rob Sitch) is the CEO of the NBA, and is constantly exasperated by his inability to achieve anything other than meetings, studies and reports. 
 Jim Gibson (Anthony Lehmann) is the government liaison. He is unceasingly positive about new government projects, while being oblivious to the problems and chaos they cause.
 Nat Russell (Celia Pacquola) is the Chief Operations Officer, and Tony's second in charge. The only other competent person in the office, she is just as frustrated as Tony.
 Scott Byrnes (Dave Lawson) is a project assistant, an enthusiastic guy who doesn't actually do much. He can sometimes be helpful to Tony.
 Rhonda Stewart (Kitty Flanagan) is the media manager. She forcefully pushes her narrow agenda, often based on some new fad, ignoring more important priorities.
 Katie Norris (Emma-Louise Wilson) is Tony's personal assistant. She constantly tries to be helpful but is somewhat incompetent.
 Hugh (Luke McGregor) is Nat's project assistant, who constantly reminds her of how difficult it is to do things. (Series 1–2)
 Amy (Michelle Lim Davidson) is the office receptionist, who is always positive and chirpy, but unable to see the big picture. (Series 1–2)
 Karsten Leith (Toby Truslove) a media and marketing content creator and an ally of Rhonda, who is highly optimistic and always has a grand vision. (Series 1–2; Guest Series 3–4)
 Ashan De Silva (Dilruk Jayasinha) is a senior project manager at the NBA with degrees in accounting, business administration and engineering. He is yet to master the office coffee machine. (Series 3–4)
 Courtney Kano (Nina Oyama) is the Executive Assistant and Office Manager, and likes to refer to herself as the NBA's Chief Happiness Officer, after having recently completed an anger management course. (Series 3–4)

Recurring characters
 Beverley Sadler (Rebecca Massey) is the head of the Human Resources Department and an experienced recruiter whose main role is conducting exit interviews with staff members who have quit after three weeks in the job. She frequently uses HR jargon and always asks what the date is. (Series 2–4) 
 Brian Collins (Jamie Robertson) has the official title 'Head of Building Services and Security', but his actual role is to ensure that everyone is wearing the correct lanyard. (Series 3–4)

Series overview

Episodes

Series 1 (2014)

Series 2 (2015)

Series 3 (2017)

Series 4 (2019)

Series 5 (2023) 
Series 5 of Utopia has been confirmed by the ABC to air in June 2023.

Reception
Anne Pender from The Conversation described Utopia as "light – but sharp and witty" political satire. She praised the talents of the writers and the cast of "exceptional actors". She also noted that it was an improvement from The Speechmaker, a stage show that Sitch and Working Dog Productions put together earlier in 2014. David Knox from TV Tonight noted the show's similarity to Sitch's previous work, The Hollowmen. In addition to praising the performances of cast members, he opined that the city backdrop of East Melbourne gave the series a "fresh, contemporary feel" accompanied by a "driving percussion soundtrack" and "cityscape montages". Ahmad Kahn from The Huffington Post drew comparisons with the earlier and more cynical seasons of American workplace comedies The Office and Parks and Recreation, as well as saying that Utopia offers a "painfully funny satire that focuses on the interaction between the media and press friendly projects wanted by government administrations and the disparities it presents to those in the agency who would prefer practicality."

Netflix purchased the rights to the program in 2015 to broadcast the first two series under the title Dreamland. Series 1 began airing on PBS in the United States on 21 July 2018.

Awards and nominations

See also
List of Australian television series
List of Australian Broadcasting Corporation programs

References

External links
Website on ABC 

2014 Australian television series debuts
Australian Broadcasting Corporation original programming
Australian comedy television series
Television shows set in Melbourne